Me and the Chimp is an American sitcom which aired for one season during 1972 on CBS. It was created by Garry Marshall and Thomas L. Miller and produced by Alan Rafkin for Paramount Television.

Premise
Mike Reynolds (Ted Bessell) is a dentist who lives with his wife (Anita Gillette), two children (Scott Kolden and Kami Cotler), and a chimpanzee named Buttons, who is a washout from the space program (a fact unknown to Mike and his family until an old army sergeant visits).

Episodes revolve around Buttons' doings or undoings, such as extending the line Mike drew on a map (to mark their driving route) onward to a ghost town, and stealing an alarm clock which gets Mike arrested for public indecency (in his pajamas).

Cast
Ted Bessell as Mike Reynolds
Anita Gillette as Liz Reynolds
Scott Kolden as Scott Reynolds
Kami Cotler as Kitty Reynolds
Jackie as Buttons

Production
The series was created by Garry Marshall and Thomas L. Miller, both of whom are better known for their later work on Happy Days and Laverne & Shirley. Bessell originally refused to participate when the title was first given as the grammatically incorrect "The Chimp and I".

The chimpanzee who portrayed Buttons was owned by veteran animal expert Lou Schumacher and was trained by Bob Rydell who was responsible for teaching the chimpanzee to perform its "acting" tasks on cue by responding to various hand and voice signals.

Episodes

Reception
TV Guide listed the show at #46 on its 2002 list "The 50 Worst Shows of All Time".

References

External links

 
 Me and the Chimp at TVGuide.com

1970s American sitcoms
1972 American television series debuts
1972 American television series endings
CBS original programming
Television series about families
Television series by CBS Studios
Television shows about chimpanzees
Television shows set in California